Cypress Lakes High School is a secondary school located in an unincorporated area in Harris County, Texas, near Houston and with a Katy postal address. Cypress Lakes, originally named Cypress-Fairbanks Independent School District High School #10, is part of the Cypress-Fairbanks Independent School District and serves students in grades 9-12. It was built along with Cypress Ranch High School and opened in fall 2008. Cypress Lakes relieve the population of Cypress Falls High School, Cypress Springs High School, and Langham Creek High School.

History
The district selected PBK Architects as the designer of the new school which uses similar blueprints to the existing Cypress Ridge, Cypress Springs, and Cypress Woods schools, following the design of a mall, that being of one main hallway becoming split into sub-hallways into the rooms. Originally the school was scheduled to open in fall 2009. The rapid growth in CFISD prompted the district to schedule the opening of the school in fall 2008. The first graduating class was the Class of 2011.

The school's first principal, Sarah Harty, was a former principal of Cypress Springs High School; she moved from Cy Springs to Cy Lakes upon the opening of the latter.

On March 28, 2014, former Houston Rockets center Dwight Howard visited the students at Cypress Lakes High School for winning the "Block Out Violence" program.

In 2016 Cypress Park High School opened, taking territory from the attendance zone of Cypress Lakes. In turn Cypress Lakes's attendance boundary took an area formerly in the boundary of Cypress Springs High School.

Academics
For the 2018-2019 school year, the school received a B grade from the Texas Education Agency, with an overall score of 86 out of 100. The school received a B grade in each of the three performance domains, with a score of 87 for Student Achievement, 87 for School Progress, and 83 for Closing the Gaps. The school received one of the seven possible distinction designations for Top 25%: Comparative Closing the Gaps.

Feeder patterns

Schools that feed into Cypress Lakes include:
Elementary schools: Lieder, Sheridan, Wilson, Emery (partial), McFee (partial), Tipps (partial)
Middle schools: Watkins, Thornton (partial)

Notable alumni
Josh Nebo (2015) – basketball player in the Israeli Premier League
De'Aaron Fox (2016) – basketball player for the Sacramento Kings

References

External links
 

Cypress-Fairbanks Independent School District high schools
2008 establishments in Texas
Educational institutions established in 2008